Thomas Casey (11 March 1930 – 13 January 2009) was a Northern Ireland international footballer, coach and football manager, whose career in professional football spanned 30 years.

In 1965, he played abroad in the Eastern Canada Professional Soccer League with Toronto Inter-Roma.

References

1930 births
2009 deaths
Association footballers from Northern Ireland
Association football wing halves
Bangor F.C. players
Leeds United F.C. players
AFC Bournemouth players
Newcastle United F.C. players
Portsmouth F.C. players
Bristol City F.C. players
Toronto Roma players
Northern Ireland international footballers
English Football League players
Eastern Canada Professional Soccer League players
Expatriate soccer players in Canada
Expatriate association footballers from Northern Ireland
Expatriate sportspeople from Northern Ireland in Canada
Gloucester City A.F.C. players
Lisburn Distillery F.C. players
Football managers from Northern Ireland
Gloucester City A.F.C. managers
Lisburn Distillery F.C. managers
Grimsby Town F.C. managers
Knattspyrnufélag Reykjavíkur managers
FA Cup Final players
Ammanford A.F.C. players